Manuel Vicente González Díaz (born 23 May 1953) is a Spanish former professional footballer who played as a defender.

Career
González started off his playing career with Sabadell of the Segunda División, the first of fifty-five appearances in two years arrived during December 1972 versus Langreo in the Copa del Rey; his league bow followed days later against Murcia. 1974 saw González join La Liga's Sporting Gijón. After twenty-three matches and two campaigns, the club were relegated to the Segunda División. He failed to make an appearance in the second tier during 1976–77, as Sporting Gijón won promotion back to La Liga. His spell with Sporting Gijón lasted two further seasons, which included him featuring ten times. González subsequently retired.

In 2006, González became the manager of Gramenet in Segunda División B. He guided the club to three consecutive mid-table finishes, winning forty games of a one hundred and seven game tenure. He departed in 2009, joining Badalona soon after. After eight matches he left.

Career statistics

Club

Managerial record

References

External links

1953 births
Sportspeople from Badajoz
Footballers from Extremadura
Spanish footballers
Association football defenders
Segunda División players
La Liga players
CE Sabadell FC footballers
Sporting de Gijón players
UDA Gramenet managers
CF Badalona managers
Living people
Spanish football managers